Education in Turkey is governed by a national system which was established in accordance with the Atatürk's Reforms. It is a state-supervised system designed to produce a skillful professional class for the social and economic institutes of the nation.

Compulsory education lasts 12 years. Primary and secondary education is financed by the state and free of charge in public schools, between the ages of 6 and 19. Secondary or high school education is not mandatory but required in order to then progress to universities. Turkey has over 200 universities as of 2022. ÖSYS, after which high school graduates are assigned to university according to their performance.

Turkey has 97% of primary school enrollment among all eligible children as of 2019. This number has significantly dropped with the Syrian refugee crisis. Many Syrian children left school during the crisis.

In 2002, the total expenditure on education in Turkey amounted to $13.4 billion, including the state budget allocated through the National Ministry of Education and private and international funds. The share of national wealth invested in educational institutions is higher in Turkey than average among OECD countries. Scientific and Technological Research Council of Turkey is the main national body of R&D in Turkey.

History

After the foundation of the Turkish Republic the organization of the Ministry of Education gradually developed and was reorganized with the Law no 2287 issued in 1933. The Ministry changed its names several times. It fell under the Ministry of Culture (1935–1941) and was named Ministry of National Education, Youth, and Sports (1983–1989). Since then it has been called the Ministry of National Education. Before the Republic, education institutions were far from having a national character. Schools were organized in three separate channels which were vertical institutions independent of each other. The first and the most common in this organization were the district schools and madrasas based on the teaching of the Quran the Arabian language and memorizing, the second were the Reform schools and high schools supporting innovation and the third were the colleges and minority schools with foreign language education.

The Law of Integration of Education, no 430 was issued on 3 March 1924. With this law, the three separate channels were combined, the first one was closed, the second was developed and the third one was taken under the inspection and monitoring of the Ministry of Education. One of its aims was to apply secularism in the area of education. By the law for the Education Organization no 789 issued on 22 March 1926 the Ministry of National Education was given responsibility for defining the degrees and equalities of the public and private schools already opened or to be opened by a ministry other than the Ministry of National Education. This Law brought new arrangements such as "no school can be opened in Turkey without the permission and agreement of the Ministry of National Education" or "curricula shall be prepared by the Ministry of National Education". The vocational-technical education institutions formerly directed by local governments were put under the responsibility of the Ministry of Education.

In 1923–24, there were in Turkey, slightly more than 7,000 secondary school students, almost 3,000 high school students, some 2,000 technical school students and officially 18,000 medrese students of whom 6,000 are claimed to be actual students and the rest who registered to be excluded from military service. The population of Turkey was at that moment some 13–14 million.

On 1 November 1928, Law no 1353 introducing a new Latin-based alphabet was accepted. In 1931, the Turkish Association of History, and in 1932, the Turkish Language Association were established to protect Turkish from influences of foreign languages, improve it as science suggests and prevent misuse of the Turkish language. The Republican Turkish authorities initially had twelve education districts headed by people appointed by the ministry, but later gave more power to local authorities, with education directors appointed by provincial authorities.
 there were 5,100 schools in 1923, this figure increased to 58,800 in 2001
 there were 361,500 students in 1923, this number increased to 16 million in 2001
 in 1923 12,200 teachers were employed, this number increased to 578,800 in 2001.
 in 1924 there were 479 medrese (Islamic schools); on average each one of them had approximately 1 or 1.5 hoca (teacher). All medrese were closed down that year by the law of Tevhid-i Tedrisat.

In 1938 mobile courses for women were organized in order to support the further education of the rural female population. Youths who finished primary school as well women to the age of 45 were admitted to take part in these courses. A course lastet for 8 months and then the teachers travelled on to a next village. Between 1940 and 1974 almost 305,000 women took part in 13,429 courses. About 240,000 graduated from the courses with success.

Until 1997 children in Turkey were obliged to take five years of education. The 1997 reforms introduced compulsory education for eight years. New legislation introduced in March 2012 prolonged compulsory education to 12 years.

In July 2017, the Justice and Development Party (AKP) government presented a new curriculum for schools, inter alia removing evolution theory and adding the concept of jihad as part of Islamic law in books.

Pre-primary education
Pre-primary education includes the optional education of children between 36 and 72 months who are under the age of compulsory primary education. Pre-primary education institutions, independent nurseries, are opened as nursery classes and practical classes within formal and non-formal education institutions with suitable physical capacity. Services related to pre-primary education are given by nurseries, kindergartens, practical classes opened first and foremost by the Ministry of National Education and by day-centers, nursery schools, day care houses, child care houses and child care institutions opened by various ministries and institutions for care or education purposes based on the provisions of ten laws, two statutes and ten regulations. In the academic year 2001–2002, 256,400 children were being educated and 14,500 teachers were employed in 10,500 pre-primary education institutions.

Primary education

Primary school lasts 4 years. Primary education covers the education and teaching directed to children between 6–14, is compulsory for all citizens, boys or girls, and is given free of charge in public schools. Primary education institutions are schools that provide eight years of uninterrupted education, at the end of which graduates receive a primary education diploma. The first four years of primary school is sometimes referred to as "First School, 1st Level" but both are correct.

There are four core subjects at first, second and third grades which are Turkish, mathematics,  (literally meaning "life knowledge"), and foreign language. At fourth grade,  is replaced by science and social studies. The foreign language taught at schools changes from school to school. The most common one is English, while some schools teach German, French or Spanish instead of English. Some private schools teach two foreign languages at the same time.

Earlier the term "middle school" was used for the three years education to follow the then compulsory five years at "First School". Now the second four years of primary education are sometimes referred to as "First School, 2nd Level" but both are correct. Primary schools may be public or private. Public schools are free but private schools' admission fees change from school to school. Foreign languages taught at private schools are usually at a higher level than at public schools since most private schools prefer hiring native speakers as teachers.

There are five core subjects at sixth and seventh grades: Turkish, mathematics, science, social studies, and foreign language. At eighth grade, social studies is replaced by "Turkish History of Revolution and Kemalism".

In the academic year 2001–2002, 10.3 million students were being educated and 375,500 teachers were employed in 34,900 schools.

Secondary education

Secondary education includes all of the general, vocational and technical education institutions that provide at least three years of education after primary school. The system for being accepted to a high school changes almost every year. Sometimes private schools have different exams, sometimes there are 3 exams for 3 years, sometimes there's only one exam but it is calculated differently, sometimes they only look at your school grades. Secondary education aims to give students a good level of common knowledge, and to prepare them for higher education, for a vocation, for life and for business in line with their interests, skills and abilities. In the academic year 2001–2002 2.3 million students were being educated and 134,800 teachers were employed in 6,000 education institutions.

General secondary education covers the education of children between 15 and 17 for at least three years after primary education. General secondary education includes high schools, foreign language teaching high schools, Anatolian High Schools, high schools of science, Anatolia teacher training high schools, and Anatolia fine arts high schools.

Vocational and technical secondary education involves the institutions that both raise students as manpower in business and other professional areas, prepare them for higher education and meet the objectives of general secondary education. Vocational and technical secondary education includes technical education schools for boys, technical education schools for girls, trade and tourism schools, religious education schools, multi-program high schools, special education schools, private education schools and health education schools.

Secondary education is often referred as high school education, since the schools are called lyceum (tr: lise).

In public high schools and vocational high schools, students attend six classes each day, which last for approximately 40 minutes each. In Anatolian high schools and private high schools, the daily programme is typically longer, up to eight classes each day, also including a lunch period. All 9th graders are taught the same classes nationwide, with minor differences in certain cases. These classes are: Turkish language, Turkish literature, mathematics, physics, chemistry, biology, geometry, world history, geography, religion & ethics, physical education, a foreign language (in most cases English), a second foreign language (most commonly German but could be French, Italian, Japanese, Arabic, Russian, or Chinese).

When students enter the 11th grade, they typically choose one of four tracks: Turkish language–mathematics, science, social sciences, and foreign languages. In vocational high schools, no tracks are offered, while in science high schools only the science tracks are offered. Different schools may have different policies; some, but not many, schools offer electives instead of academic tracks, giving students a wider range of options. For the 10th, 11th and 12th grade, the compulsory courses are: Turkish language, Turkish literature and republican history. In addition to that, students may be taught the following classes, depending on the track they choose and/or the high school they attend: mathematics, geometry, statistics, physics, biology, chemistry, geography, philosophy, psychology, sociology, economy, logic, arts and music, traffic and health, computer, physical education, first and second foreign language.

The students used to be given a diploma for the academic track they had chosen, which gave them an advantage if they wanted to pursue their higher education in the corresponding fields, as the University Entrance Exam scores were weighted according to the student's track. (e.g. A science student would have an advantage over a Turkish-Mathematics student when applying for Medicine). As of the 2010–2011 educational year, all high school students are given the standard high school diploma.

At the end of high school, following the 12th grade, students take a high school finishing examination and they are required to pass this in order to take the University Entrance Exam and continue their studies at a university. There are four score types for different academic fields, including but not limited to:

Turkish language–mathematics: international relations, law, education, psychology, economy, business management, and similar.
Science: engineering, computer science, medicine, and other science-related professions.
Social sciences: history, geography, and education.
Foreign languages: language/linguistics and language teaching.

International education

The International Baccalaureate has been available in Turkey since 1994 when the first school was authorized by the IB and 53 schools now offer one or more of the IB programmes.

Vocational education

Vocational and technical secondary education involves the institutions that both raise students as manpower in business and other professional areas, prepare them for higher education and meet the objectives of general secondary education. Vocational and technical secondary education includes technical education schools for boys, technical education schools for girls, trade and tourism schools, religious education schools, multi-program high schools, special education schools, private education schools and health education schools. In the academic year 2001–2002, 821,900 students were being educated and 66,100 teachers were employed in 3,400 vocational and technical secondary education schools.

According to Article 37 of Vocational Education Lhiaw no 3308, the Ministry of National Education is organizing vocational courses in order to prepare the people who have left the formal education system and do not possess the qualifications required for employment for any vacant positions in the business sector. Based on apprenticeship training programs, the Ministry of National Education pays the insurance premiums against occupational accidents, sicknesses during the vocational period and other sicknesses of participants attending courses in relation to their occupation. These participants may take experienced apprenticeship exams after the education they have received and the work they have performed are evaluated according to the Regulations for Evaluating the Certificates and Diplomas in Apprenticeship and Vocational Training.

People who work in the 109 branches mentioned in Law no 3308, have finished primary education and are below the age of 14 may receive training as candidate apprentices or apprentices. Law no 4702 gives apprenticeship training opportunity to those over 19. The period of apprentice training changes between 2–4 years depending on the nature of vocations.

Adolescents who have not attended the formal education system or left the system at any stage may take the experienced apprenticeship exam after 1 year of adaptation training, provided they had reached the age of 16 at the date when the said profession was included in the coverage of law. Those at the age of 18 may directly take the experienced apprenticeship exam, if a certificate is provided to prove that he/she is working in the related profession.

Those who graduate from vocational and technical secondary education institutions or from vocational and technical schools and institutions may take proficiency exam in their own professions.
Graduates of technical high school or of 4-year programs in vocational and technical schools and institutions are given a certificate to start businesses with the privileges and responsibilities of a proficiency certificate. In 2001, 248,400 apprentices were being educated and 5,100 teachers were employed in 345 vocational training centers.

The new system: 4+4+4

In March 2012 the Grand National Assembly passed new legislation on primary and secondary education usually termed as "4+4+4" (4 years primary education, first level, 4 years primary education, second level and 4 years secondary education). Children will begin their primary education in the first month of September following their sixth birthdays and will come to a close during the school year in which students turn 14 years old.

The primary education stages, which includes the first two stages of four years' education each, will entail four years of mandatory elementary education, followed by an additional mandatory four years of middle school education, in which students will be able to choose whether they want to study at a general education middle school or a religious vocational middle school, which are referred to as Imam Hatip schools. The new legislation includes the reopening of Imam Hatip middle schools.
Primary education establishments will be set up separately as independent elementary schools and middle schools.

Universities

Higher education includes all levels of institutions giving education past the secondary school level for a period of at least 17 years.

Higher education institutions include:
 Universities
 Faculties
 Institutes
 Higher education schools
 Vocational higher education schools
 Conservatories
 Application and research centers

In the 1930s, at the suggestion of Albert Einstein, the Atatürk government hired over a thousand established academics, including world renowned émigré professors escaping the Nazi takeover in Germany. Most were in medicine, mathematics, and natural science, plus a few in the faculties of law and the arts. Germany's exiled professors served as directors in eight of twelve Istanbul's basic science Institutes, as well as six directors of Istanbul's seventeen clinics at the Faculty of Medicine.

In the academic year 2001–2002 there were 76 universities, 53 of which belonged to the state and 23 to foundations. In these institutions 66,700 personnel were working, 63,000 in state universities and 3,700 in others.

After the national university entrance examination organized by the national examining body students, if they succeed, continue with their studies at a university. Foreign students take the Yös exam or provide equivalent credentials approved by the Higher Education Council (YÖK).

Universities provide either two or four years of education for undergraduate studies, while graduate programs last a minimum of two years. Some universities also ask for an additional year of English preparatory study to be completed before the start of studies, unless an exemption examination is passed.

There are around 820 higher education institutions including universities with a total student enrollment of over 1 million. Tertiary education is the responsibility of the Higher Education Council, and funding is provided by the state for public institutions that make up the bulk of the tertiary education system. There are 167 universities in Turkey, which are classified as either public or foundational (private) and 373,353 students were graduated from these universities in 2006. Public universities typically charge very low fees while private foundation universities are highly expensive with fees that can reach $30,000 per annum. Since 1998, universities have been given greater autonomy and were encouraged to raise funds through partnerships with industry.

The quality of education at the Turkish universities varies greatly, some providing education and facilities on par with internationally renowned schools (the technical universities are often compared with universities in the United States, and are regularly visited by the US Accreditation Board for Engineering and Technology and their engineering programs deemed substantially equivalent to comparable programs in the US.

Turkish universities actively participate in the Socrates – Erasmus program of the European Commission, aiming to increase student and academician mobility within the European Union, the European Economic Area countries, and other EU candidate states. An increasing number of Turkish university students complete a part of their studies abroad at other participating countries' universities, and Turkish universities receive students of the same status from abroad.
With the passage of law 2547, the rectors of all the public universities are appointed jointly by the faculty, Higher Education Council and the President of Turkey. The former president, Abdullah Gül, suggested that the system might be changed to eliminate the Higher Education Council and political influence.

Research
The Scientific and Technological Research Council of Turkey (TÜBİTAK) coordinates basic and applied research and development, acting on proposed policies by the Turkish Academy of Sciences (TÜBA). There are more than 60 research institutes and organizations. Turkey's R&D strengths include agriculture, forestry, health, biotechnology, nuclear technologies, minerals, materials, IT, and defence.

Private schools
In the Turkish education system, private schools may be grouped into four.
 Private Turkish schools: In these schools, which are opened by real or corporate bodies of Turkish nationality, public education programs at pre-primary, primary and secondary education levels are given.
 Private schools for minorities: These have been established in the Ottoman Empire period by Greek, Armenian and Jewish minorities and were placed under guarantee by the terms of the Lausanne Treaty. These schools are attended by students at pre-primary, primary and secondary education levels who belong to these minority classes and are of the Turkish nationality.
 Private foreign schools: These are schools established during the Ottoman Empire by French, German, Italian, Austrian and American people who continue their activities under the terms of the Lausanne Treaty. Today these schools are attended by Turkish children.
 Private international education institutions: They have been opened and are active as per the provisions in the amended article 5 of the Law no. 625.

There are many dershane in cities. They will transform into academic high schools in 2015, as the new law requires.

Religious education

De-establishment
In 1927, all courses concerning religion were excluded from the curriculum of primary, secondary, and high schools on the basis that non-Muslims also live in Turkey. Between 1927 and 1949, religious instruction was not permitted in schools. In 1949, the Ministry of Education allowed a course on religion in 4th and 5th grades of primary school.

Re-establishment
In 1956, as a result of multi-party democracy, a new government was established. Being more sympathetic towards the religious sentiments of society, this new government introduced a religion course into secondary schools. This time, if the parents wanted to exempt their children from the course, they had to apply to the school with a written request. After nearly ten years, in 1967, the religion course was introduced to the 1st and 2nd grades of high school. Students, however, were enrolled for the course with the written request of their parents. In 1975, the course was extended to the third (last) grade of the high schools. And, finally, following the military coup in 1980, the religion course became schools was also constitutionally secured. The exact title of the course was, "The Culture of Religion and Knowledge of Ethics."

In 1985, the Institute for Creation Research, a United States creationist group, helped advise Turkey's education minister Vehbi Dinçerler on how to introduce creationism in high schools. Turkish academics have stated that the resulting ignorance of evolution led to Turkey coming last in a survey that measured knowledge of evolution in 34 industrialised nations.

Currently, religious education courses begin at the 4th grade (age10) of primary school and continues throughout secondary and high schools. From the 4th to the 8th grade, classes consist of two hours per week. At the high school level, there is one hour of class per week Thus, a student who has graduated from high school receives 8 continuous years of religion courses. There are no fixed books for the course. Rather, each school decides which book to follow—provided that the book for each level is approved by the Ministry of Education. Nearly half of the content of these courses concerns religion and Islam (whom majority are Muslims) with remaining topics ranging from secularism to humanism and from ethical values to etiquette. The major world religions such as Judaism, Christianity, Hinduism and Buddhism are included in the content of the course.

Foreign languages

The most common foreign language is English, which in public schools is taught from 2nd grade (age 8) onwards through to the end of high school. In high school a second foreign language is introduced. However the number of lessons given in public schools is minimal compared to private schools, which begin teaching English in kindergarten, have two or three times as many English lessons in the timetable, and in many cases employ native speakers of English as teachers.

In 2011 the Ministry of Education, under pressure from the Prime Minister to improve the learning of English in Turkey, announced that the approach to language would be thoroughly revised, part of which would include a plan to hire 40,000 foreigners as language assistants in public schools. As a result of the poor standards achieved by the public system many students take an intensive English language "prep year" when entering university. These are offered by both state and private universities throughout Turkey.

In 2012, the Ministry of Education included Kurdish (based on both Kurmanji and Zazaki dialects) to the academic programme of the basic schools as optional classes from the fifth year on.

Later, the Ministry of Education also included Abkhaz, Adyghe, Standard Georgian, and Laz languages in 2013, and Albanian as well as Bosnian languages in February 2017.

In 2015, the Ministry of Education announced that as of the 2016–17 academic year, Arabic courses (as a second language) will be offered to students in elementary school starting in second grade. The Arabic courses will be offered as an elective language course like German, French and English. According to a prepared curriculum, second and third graders will start learning Arabic by listening-comprehension and speaking, while introduction to writing will join these skills in fourth grade and after fifth grade students will start learning the language in all its four basic skills.

Indoctrination

Turkish education system requires students to be educated on the basis of Turkish nationalism in Atatürk's thought (Atatürk milliyetçiliği) and aims to create individuals who are committed to laique, democratic values of Turkey.During Atatürk's presidency, schools to Turkefy the Kurds such as the Elazig Girls' Institute were set up. In the late 1990s, the National Security Council, which at the time was dominated by a secular military, demanded the administration of the Prime Minister Necmettin Erbakan to carry out regulations aiming to curb rising Islamic fundamentalism.

Every weekday early in the morning student oath was to be sung by students until it was abolished in 2013. In every classroom, a portrait of Atatürk, lyrics of the National Anthem and text of Atatürk's Address to Turkish Youth are hung high up at the wall. In history lessons, nationalistic values are promoted and denialism of Armenian genocide is taught.

Criticism

Education 
Constant alterations of education system in Turkey has caused controversy. In 2005 preparatory classes for foreign languages were abolished with only a few high school being exempt from. The examination system for entrance to high schools and universities has been constantly changed since the early 2000s. 17 thousand students getting full scores in first session of TEOG ("transition [exam] from basic education to secondary education") has also caused controversy. Counselor of Ministry of National Education Yusuf Tekin answered this concern by stating students who get full scores in both sessions must be treated as people actually taking the first place which 665 such students exist. Reduction of topics about Atatürk, downgrading in positive sciences teaching and promotion of religious content has drawn reactions.

School meals 
In late 2010, a group of students brought food to school from home and shared their meal with each other in order to boycott the school canteen due to the rising prices which resulted in 3 students being taken into police custody. In early 2012, another school canteen was boycotted in a similar manner which resulted in one student being expelled from the school due to him "giving information to the press and distributing leaflets without obtaining permission from the school principality". In 2018, school canteens were criticised for selling banned products such as chocolate-covered wafer, cakes, and plastic toys which were designated to be unhealthy for children.

Textbooks 
Although the government distributes free textbooks, there is a high demand for private textbooks due to the low quality of state-approved textbooks. The purchase of private textbooks is not obligatory, nevertheless, families feel compelled to buy them so that their children receive a better education. The usage of private textbooks in schools is officially prohibited.

See also
Nation's schools

References

External links
OECD Education Policy Outlook: Turkey 
Guide For International Students 
Ministry of National Education 
Population and Development Indicators, by the Turkish Statistical Institute, Prime Ministry of the Republic of Turkey (Turkish and English)
 National Education Statistics Formal Education 2012– 2013
 Information on education in Turkey, OECD - Contains indicators and information about Turkey and how it compares to other OECD and non-OECD countries
 Diagram of Turkish education system, OECD - Using 1997 ISCED classification of programmes and typical ages. Also in Turkish
Turkish Education: Same Old Religious Obsession, Only Worse Burak Bekdil, Gatestone Institute